Frederick N. Six (born April 20, 1929) was a justice of the Kansas Supreme Court from September 1, 1988, to January 13, 2003.

He was appointed to the supreme court by Kansas Governor Mike Hayden to replace David Prager who retired.

Six, who was serving as an attorney in Lawrence, was appointed to the Kansas Court of Appeals to succeed Judge Sherman A. Parks in August 1987 by Kansas Governor Mike Hayden.

When he retired in 2003, Marla J. Luckert was appointed to replace him on the court.

His son Stephen Six is also a Kansas judge and was appointed Kansas Attorney General in 2008.

References

Kansas Court of Appeals Judges
Justices of the Kansas Supreme Court
1929 births
Living people
People from Lawrence, Kansas